Mirleft (Amazigh: ⵎⵉⵔⵍⴼⵜ) is a small town and rural commune in Sidi Ifni Province of the Guelmim-Oued Noun region of Morocco. At the time of the 2004 census, the commune had a total population of 7026 people living in 1303 households.

Description 
Mirleft is perched on top of the gigantic ocher-colored cliffs bordering the ocean. The view of the Atlantic coast is magnificent, especially from Fort Tidli. Built in 1935, this now abandoned military fort dominates the ocean as well as the traditional town where you can find various and varied local products: argan oil, Moroccan pottery, slippers, etc.

But Mirleft is above all renowned for being an excellent spot for water sports (surf,bodyboard.. )thanks to its wind and regular rolls offering the ideal conditions for surfing, windsurfing and kitesurfing.

The waters of Mirleft are also known to be rich in variety and quantity of fish. Fishing enthusiasts will undoubtedly find their happiness here. Among the species present in Mirleft.

References

Populated places in Sidi Ifni Province
Rural communes of Guelmim-Oued Noun